Maud Elisabeth Olofsson (born Olsson, 9 August 1955) is a former Swedish politician who was the leader of the Swedish Centre Party from 2001 to 2011, Minister for Enterprise and Energy from 2006 to 2011 and Deputy Prime Minister of Sweden from 2006 to 2010. She was a member of the Riksdag from 2002 to 2011.

Biography
Maud Olofsson was born in Arnäsvall, and grew up in Högbyn, in Örnsköldsvik Municipality, Västernorrland. She started her political career as an ombudsman of the youth organisation of the Centre Party in 1974, and served as a member of the local council in Luleå from 1976. From 1978 to 1981 she held the same job with the party. From 1992 to 1994, during the Carl Bildt centre-right government, she worked as Special Adviser to Minister Börje Hörnlund at the Department of Labour. From 1996 she has been a member of the Centre Party board. From 1997 to 2001 she worked as Managing Director for the Rural Economy and Agricultural Societies (Hushållningssällskapet) in Västerbotten. She was elected Party Leader on 19 March 2001, succeeding Lennart Daléus. After the 2002 election, the Centre Party's first electoral upturn since 1973 was attributed to the "Maud effect."

Olofsson's political standpoint could be seen as a traditional Centre Party position, with an emphasis on rural Sweden and the survival of rural communities, combined with centre-right economic policies. It was however a remarkable new feature in the history of the Centre Party, when Olofsson characterized her party's ideology as Social Liberalism. Although the Centre Party in history has sometimes cooperated with the governing Social Democrats, under Olofsson the party opted for a clear oppositional role, strengthening its alliance with the Liberals, the Christian Democrats and the Moderate Party.

Olofsson modernised the party, making it more open to the European Union and market liberalism. She was involved in the construction of the right-wing coalition Alliansen.

Following its victory in the elections in 2006, this alliance was able to form a new government under Fredrik Reinfeldt. Olofsson was appointed Deputy Prime Minister and Minister for Enterprise and Energy.

Olofsson announced her intent to step down as party leader on 17 June 2011 and was succeeded by Annie Lööf on 23 September 2011. Following her retirement, she faced criticism after it was revealed that the Swedish state-owned energy company Vattenfall had paid too much for Dutch energy company Nuon in 2009 when she was the responsible minister.

Bibliography
 Rapport från kvinnoprojektet: Robertsfors kvinnor mot år 2000 (1992)
 Min dröm för Sverige (2006)
 Ett land av friherrinnor : mina rötter, värderingar och drömmar för Sverige (2010)
 Jag är den jag är (2014)

References

External links

Centre Party
Swedish Parliament: Maud Olofsson

|-

|-

1955 births
Living people
Members of the Riksdag from the Centre Party (Sweden)
Deputy Prime Ministers of Sweden
People from Örnsköldsvik Municipality
Swedish feminists
Leaders of political parties in Sweden
Women members of the Riksdag
Women government ministers of Sweden
Members of the Riksdag 2002–2006
Members of the Riksdag 2006–2010
Members of the Riksdag 2010–2014
21st-century Swedish women politicians